Ronald Raymond Streck (born July 17, 1954) is an American professional golfer who has played on the PGA Tour and Nationwide Tour, and is a current player on the Champions Tour.

Career
Streck was born in Tulsa, Oklahoma. His father started him playing golf at age 3. He attended the University of Tulsa from 1973 to 1976, and was twice an All-American. He turned pro in 1976.

Streck had several notable "firsts" in the annals of professional golf, earning him the nickname "Milestone Man". He was the first PGA player to play with Metalwoods. He was the first PGA player to win with Metalwoods (at the 1981 Michelob-Houston Open). With his victory in 2005 at the Commerce Bank Championship, he became the first player to win events on all three U.S.-based men's professional Tours (PGA, Nationwide, and Champions). In addition, he won in Morocco in 1983 in a tournament that was later on the European Tour.

In 1997, Streck was inducted into the University of Tulsa Athletics Hall of Fame. He is married with three children and lives in Tulsa, Oklahoma.

Professional wins (6)

PGA Tour wins (2)

*Note: The 1981 Michelob-Houston Open was shortened to 54 holes due to weather.

PGA Tour playoff record (0–1)

Nike Tour wins (1)

Nike Tour playoff record (1–0)

Other wins (2)
1983 Hassan II Golf Trophy
1984 Chrysler Team Championship (with Phil Hancock)

Champions Tour wins (1)

Results in major championships

CUT = missed the half-way cut
"T" indicates a tie for a place

See also
 Fall 1976 PGA Tour Qualifying School graduates

References

External links

American male golfers
Tulsa Golden Hurricane men's golfers
PGA Tour golfers
PGA Tour Champions golfers
Golfers from Oklahoma
Sportspeople from Tulsa, Oklahoma
1954 births
Living people